The Enclos Fouqué is the most recent caldera build by the Piton de la Fournaise, the active volcano of the isle of la Réunion.

References

Landforms of Réunion
Calderas of Réunion